The Marxist–Leninist Party of Germany (MLPD) is a communist political party in Germany. It was founded in 1982 by members of the Communist Workers Union of Germany (KABD) and is one of the minor parties in Germany. 

The MLPD advocates for the establishment of a seizure of power through the proletariat, overthrowing current capitalist relations of production and replacing them with a new social order of socialist orientation. It sees this as a transitional stage to the creation of a classless, communist society. In doing so, it refers to the theory and practice of Karl Marx, Friedrich Engels, Vladimir Lenin. It rejects the terms "Stalinism" and "Maoism" as anti-communist fighting terms that divide the Marxist–Leninist movement. Whilst criticizing particular aspects of the political works of Stalin and Mao, MLPD openly defends those works, standing in contrast to most left-wing groups in Germany.

It participates in the International Conference of Marxist–Leninist Parties and Organizations (ICMLPO) and the International Coordination of Revolutionary Parties and Organizations (ICOR). Representatives from the party have attended congresses of other communist parties around the world.

Political profile

Real Socialism 

The MLPD calls its political orientation "" ("Real Socialism"). The party says that the augmentation "" ("Real") has the tactical purpose "to distinguish itself from the various distortions of modern revisionism and reformism", like Trotskyism, which the MLPD calls a "petty-bourgeouis divergence from Marxism". In this way the party distinguishes itself from other left parties, like the German Communist Party, The Left or the Socialist Equality Party.

Environmental policy and the vision of the future of real socialism 
On the day of the party's meeting in 2012, the decision was taken to make environmental work the second most important line of action. The MLPD believes that the earth is in a 'rapid and extended transition from the environmental crisis to a global environmental disaster', which threatens the very foundations of human life. Therefore, the 'threatening destruction of the unity of man and nature' has become a 'central issue of class struggle'. In order to continue to make maximum profits, systematic environmental destruction through capitalist production has become a general necessity. The party sees a way out of socialism and communism to be built through an international revolution, without which humanity is doomed to collapse. The party calls for a change in the basic guidelines of production, thinking, working and living, as well as scientific activity. The constant growth of production and profit, the orientation of the media, education, public opinion towards the profit economy and the systematic rejection of the "unity of nature and man" and mass consumption and consumption of resources "without regard to losses" must be overcome. This "total social paradigm shift" is immediately necessary to "save the unity of man and nature," but a radical change in the way production and consumption, thinking and the work process first demand a change in power relations. By abolishing the relationship between goods, the future dictatorship of the proletariat could focus on satisfying human needs in harmony with nature. A constant "class struggle for change in the way of thinking in socialist society" is a basic prerequisite.

History 
The MLPD promotes Marxism–Leninism and Mao Zedong Thought. Only part of the MLPD's membership originates from the 1960s students' movement. Willi Dickhut, the party's founder, had been expelled from the Communist Party of Germany in 1966 for criticizing the change of social conditions in the Soviet Union. His book on the restoration of capitalism in the Soviet Union was published in 1971 and is a fundamental part of the MLPD's ideology. The MLPD describes the political and economic changes in most of the Eastern European countries after the 20th Party Congress of the Communist Party of the Soviet Union as treason to socialism. From 1976, when the economic changes provided by Deng Xiaoping were taking place, the MLPD's predecessor organizations criticized those changes as China's restoration of capitalism.

In the 1998 federal elections, the party gained only 0.01 percent of the votes. In 2002, the MLPD did not participate in the federal elections and called on people to boycott. The MLPD participated in the 2005 federal elections, generally positioning itself in campaigns as a radical alternative to the Left Party. The MLPD won 0.1 percent of the total votes cast. This marked a tenfold increase compared to the result of 1998, despite the competition with the Left Party. Its strongest showing was in the states of Saxony-Anhalt and Thuringia, where it garnered 0.4 percent of the vote. MLPD also participated in 2009 federal elections and has announced its participation in the 2013 federal elections.

Still some trade unions in Germany have a policy of expelling members of the MLPD. An example of this is when the former chairman of the party, Stefan Engel, was forced to leave the IG Metall and became a member of Ver.di, which does not take a stance against the MLPD.

For the 2017 federal election the MLPD formed the Internationalistischen Bündnis (Internationalist Alliance) coalition. The coalition is made up of different local electoral groups, migrant organizations (such as ATIF, ADHK and the German section of the Communist party of Iran) and labor union groups.

Although the party has seen little success in national or state elections, the party has managed to gain a number of local councils seats. However these party are contested under a different local label and not with an explicit communist program. However these parties are all members of the MLPD-led electoral coalition Internationalist Alliance.

Election results

Federal Parliament

European Parliament

Local Elections of Alliances with MLPD Participation

Well-known former members of the MLPD 
 Robert Kurz German Marxist theorist
 Berthold Huber German unionist

References

External links 
 

1982 establishments in Germany
Communist parties in Germany
Far-left politics in Germany
International Conference of Marxist–Leninist Parties and Organizations (International Newsletter)
International Coordination of Revolutionary Parties and Organizations
Maoist parties
Political parties established in 1982
Maoist organisations in Germany